Ghost gum may refer to a number of Australian evergreen tree species including:

 Corymbia aparrerinja, a central Australian species
 Corymbia bella, a northern Australian species
 Corymbia blakei, an northeastern Australian species
 Corymbia dallachiana, an eastern Australian species
 Corymbia papuana, a northeastern Australian species
 Corymbia candida, a northwestern Australian species
 Corymbia dendromerinx, a northwestern Australian species

References